Love Love UK & European Arena Tour LIVE 2010 is a Live album by Scottish recording artist Amy Macdonald released on 25 April 2011 in the United Kingdom. The album peaked at No. 89 on the Swiss Albums Chart.

Track listing

Disc 1
 "Ordinary Life"
 "Poison Prince"
 "Love Love"
 "Mr Rock & Roll"
 "Footballers Wife"
 "Spark"
 "L.A."
 "Youth of Today"
 "Pretty Face"
 "Don't Tell Me That It's Over"

Disc 2
 "Troubled Soul"
 "Give It All Up"
 "Next Big Thing"
 "No Roots"
 "Run"
 "This Is the Life"
 "What Happiness Means To Me"

Disc 3
 "Born to Run"
 "Let's Start a Band"

Chart performance

Release history

References

2011 live albums
Live EPs
Amy Macdonald albums